is the sixteenth single of the Japanese boy band Arashi. The single was released in two editions: a regular edition containing a bonus track and karaoke versions of all the songs released in the single, and a limited edition containing a DVD with the music video of the A-side.

Single information
"Kitto Daijōbu" was used as an image song in the television advertisement of C1000×. The song was performed many times throughout 2006, most notably during the 2006 Asia Song Festival in Seoul, South Korea when the group was there as a representative of Japan along with Kumi Koda. The song has been cited as a favorite by several artists such as singer Ken Hirai, who spoke of his obsession with the song during one of his on-stage performances "Ken's Bar" and Music Station on May 29, 2009, and Eiji Wentz of the duo WaT, who sang the song on Utaban though he did not know the title of the song.

Track listing

Charts and certifications

Charts

Sales and certifications

References

External links
 https://www.j-storm.co.jp/arashi/discography/%E3%81%8D%E3%81%A3%E3%81%A8%E5%A4%A7%E4%B8%88%E5%A4%AB Product information] 

Arashi songs
2006 singles
Oricon Weekly number-one singles
2006 songs
J Storm singles
Songs written by Sho Sakurai